St Anthony's College may refer to:

 St Antony's College, Oxford, England
 St. Anthony's College, Kandy, Central Province, Sri Lanka
 St. Anthony's College, Mijas, Andalusia, Spain
 St. Anthony's College, Wattala, Sri Lanka
 St Anthony's College, Leuven, Belgium
 St. Anthony's College, San Jose de Buenavista, Antique, Philippines

See also
 St. Anthony's School (disambiguation)
 St. Anthony College, Roxas City, Capiz, Philippines
 Saint Anthony (disambiguation)